Juan Cruz Guasone (born 27 March 2001) is an Argentine professional footballer who plays as a centre-back for Estudiantes.

Career
Guasone had two-year spells in the youth ranks of Lanús and Rosario Central before joining Patronato in 2018; following a trial in 2017. He was moved into the club's first-team squad in 2020–21, with the centre-back initially appearing as an unused substitute for Copa de la Liga Profesional matches with Huracán and Gimnasia y Esgrima in November. His senior debut soon arrived in that competition later that month, on 29 November, during a 1–0 defeat away to Huracán; he played the full ninety minutes, picking up a yellow card in the process.

Career statistics
.

Notes

References

External links

2001 births
Living people
People from San Nicolás de los Arroyos
Argentine footballers
Association football defenders
Argentine Primera División players
Club Atlético Patronato footballers
Sportspeople from Buenos Aires Province